A national fourth tier of English league football was established in 1958–59, as the Fourth Division. It was formed from the merger of the Third Division North and the Third Division South. In 1992, with the departure of the First Division clubs to become the Premier League, the fourth tier became known as the Third Division. Since 2004 it has been known as Football League Two.

Football League Fourth Division (1958–1992)

Football League Third Division (1992–2004)

Football League Two/EFL League Two (2004 onwards)

Number of titles overall
Clubs in bold are competing in the 2022–23 EFL League Two.

References
 

EFL League Two
Football League Fourth Division
Football League Third Division
EFL winners League Two